Satan's Playground, also known as Chemistry, is a 2006 American horror film directed and written by Dante Tomaselli. The film stars Felissa Rose, Ellen Sandweiss, and Edwin Neal.

This was Sandweiss' first film appearance since 1981's The Evil Dead, and was the first time Tomaselli did not serve as the producer of his own film.

Plot
Donna (Felissa Rose) and Frank (Salvatore Paul Piro) Bruno have decided to take a trip into the Pine Barrens with their autistic son Sean (Danny Lopes), new mother Paula (Ellen Sandweiss), and her baby Anthony (Marco Rose). When their car breaks down in the middle of the forest Frank goes off to find help and comes across the house of Mrs. Leeds (Irma St. Paule), a palm reader that lives there with her mute daughter Judy (Christie Sanford) and her son. Mrs. Leeds rushes him into the house, insisting that the Jersey Devil lives in the forest. However, despite her concern, it soon becomes apparent that her family is just as dangerous when Judy murders Frank.

One by one the people remaining in the car go out to search for their lost family members. Donna goes off in search of Frank and is assaulted and captured by the Leeds. Sean wanders off and gets lost in the woods. Paula initially tries to stay in the car and keep her baby safe, but inevitably leaves the car to investigate a police cruiser. However rather than containing help, it contains the corpse of an officer killed by the Jersey Devil. When she returns to the car she finds that Anthony has been taken and she goes off in search of him, which takes her to the Leeds house, where she's killed by the Leeds. Sean eventually makes it to the Leeds house where he is given a palm reading and then sent back into the night, where he gets sucked underground by what appears to be quicksand. This leaves only Donna alive, who manages to escape by bribing the Leeds son with diazepam. She eventually makes it to safety and wakes up in a hospital bed, where she is told that the Leeds house has been abandoned for years. Donna manages to persuade the police to check out the Leeds house in the hopes of finding Anthony, only for the Leeds to murder the police officer accompanying her. Terrified, Donna flees the house and tries to once again make it to safety, but is then killed by the Jersey Devil.

Cast

Reception 

The film holds a rating of 67% on Rotten Tomatoes, based on 6 reviews, with an average rating of 6.30/10. 
Variety gave the film a positive review, noting that while it was more accessible than some of his previous films, it still would not appeal to all viewers. Overall the magazine called it a "richly atmospheric exercise in surreal horror". JoBlo.com and Slant Magazine both praised the film, and JoBlo's reviewer noted that the movie was "a relentless and uber entertaining circus of horror". Dread Central's review was more mixed, praising the film's look as "polished" while criticizing the film's acting and non-linear story line.

References

External links 
 

2006 films
2006 horror films
2000s avant-garde and experimental films
2006 independent films
American avant-garde and experimental films
American independent films
American monster movies
American supernatural horror films
2000s English-language films
Films about autism
Films about cryptids
Films about families
Films set in forests
Films set in New Jersey
Films shot in New Jersey
Jersey Devil in fiction
Films about mass murder
Films about Satanism
Supernatural slasher films
2000s American films